Nils Ohlin (1895–1958) was a Swedish stage and film actor. Primarily acting in the theatre, he also appeared in a variety of films from the silent era to the 1950s as a character actor.

Selected filmography
 De landsflyktige (1921)
 Johan Ulfstjerna (1923)
 Ingmar's Inheritance (1925)
 She Is the Only One (1926)
 The Tales of Ensign Stål (1926)
 The Rivals (1926)
 Say It with Music (1929)
 The Love Express (1932)
 Wife for a Day (1933)
 Adventure in Pyjamas (1935)
 Mother Gets Married (1937)
 Life Begins Today (1939)
 Lasse-Maja (1941)
 In Paradise (1941)
 A Girl for Me (1943)
 Two Women (1947)
 Love Wins Out (1949)
 Playing Truant (1949)
 Divorced (1951)
 Blondie, Beef and the Banana (1952)
 Simon the Sinner (1954)

References

Bibliography
 Gustafsson, Tommy. Masculinity in the Golden Age of Swedish Cinema: A Cultural Analysis of 1920s Films. McFarland, 2014.

External links

1895 births
1958 deaths
Swedish male film actors
Swedish male silent film actors
Swedish male stage actors
20th-century Swedish male actors
Male actors from Stockholm